The Subsea Valley(SSV) geographically consists of Fornebu, Sandvika, Asker, Tranby, Drammen, Hokksund and Kongsberg, totaling approximately 75 km in length. The SSV consists of 184 firms and currently incorporates three of the five major subsea engineering companies that compete in the industry. The major engineering companies within the SV are FMC Technologies, Aker Solutions and GE Vetco. With regard to subsea production systems, Norwegian suppliers have gained global market shares in the range of 60-70%, and companies such as FMC Technologies, Aker Solutions and GE are truly global players within this segment. The competitors located outside the cluster are Cameron and DrillQuip. In a recent report by TESS it is stated that in addition to the companies, which are present in the SSV area, as many as 600 companies are in one or another way connected to the valley.  The three central companies in Subsea Valley – FMC Technologies, Aker Solutions and GE Vetco – are supplying oil & gas extraction equipment to such hydrocarbon operators as Statoil, Exxon and Petrobras.

History
The Subsea Valley cluster organization was formally established on June 8, 2010. Some early members were FMC Technologies, Aker Solutions, BI Drammen and TESS as. The initiative was largely taken by TESS as with help from BI Drammen. In its early phase a vision of developing into a “global knowledge hub”, thus keeping the world leading competence simultaneously with further developments in the industry, was declared by the SSV. Erik Jølberg adds further that some cluster specific initiatives have been recorded. The establishment of a subsea program at the Buskerud College with FMC employees as teachers began in January 2011. An internet page has been set up. To facilitate inter-firms communication the “Speed Match meeting” has been established, allowing suppliers and producers to meet for 15 minutes and discuss their products and needs. Also, attempts to secure founding from governmental institutions (e.g. Innovasjon Norge) have been undertaken.

References

Geography of Norway